= Steve Gwynne =

British fire safety scientist

- Born: United Kingdom
- Citizenship: United Kingdom
- Education: University of Greenwich
- Known for: Research on human behaviour in fire and wildfire evacuation; evacuation modelling
- Scientific career
- Fields: Fire safety engineering; human behaviour in emergencies; evacuation modelling
- Workplaces: University of Greenwich; National Research Council Canada; Movement Strategies
- Thesis: Representing Occupant Interaction with Smoke for Evacuation Modelling (2000)
- Doctoral advisor: Edwin Galea

Steve Gwynne is a British fire safety scientist whose work focuses on human behaviour in emergencies and evacuation modelling. He is Professor of Evacuation and Pedestrian Dynamics at the University of Greenwich's Fire Safety Engineering Group (FSEG). He has held research and leadership roles in government and industry, including at the National Research Council Canada and at Movement Strategies (a GHD company).

== Education ==
Gwynne completed a PhD at the University of Greenwich in 2000 with a dissertation on representing occupant interaction with smoke for evacuation modelling.

== Career ==
Gwynne began his career with the Fire Safety Engineering Group at the University of Greenwich, publishing on evacuation modelling and human behaviour in fire. He later worked as a Senior and Principal Research Officer at the National Research Council Canada on evacuation and pedestrian dynamics, co-authoring government-backed technical work on human behaviour in fire and wildfire evacuation modelling.

In industry, he served as Research Lead at Movement Strategies, contributing to studies and guidance on evacuation drills, crowd behaviour and wildfire evacuation. In 2024–2025 he was listed as an author from the University of Greenwich on an ISCRAM proceedings paper documenting the 2024 Roxborough Park (Colorado) wildfire evacuation drill, a cross-agency exercise studied by researchers and emergency managers.

He has also held adjunct or visiting roles, including adjunct faculty at the University of Maryland and an adjunct/visiting appointment at Lund University in Sweden focused on evacuation and pedestrian dynamics.

Gwynne's research includes widely cited work on evacuation modelling and human factors in fire. A 2001 study co-authored with Ed Galea and colleagues described modelling occupant interaction with fire conditions using the buildingEXODUS evacuation model. His later publications include a peer-reviewed paper documenting a community wildfire evacuation drill at Roxborough Park, Colorado (2019), published in Fire Technology and indexed by PubMed Central.

His work on wildfire evacuation modelling (including the WUI-NITY platform) appears in government and academic sources, such as National Research Council Canada reports and journal articles on wildland–urban interface (WUI) evacuation.

Gwynne and collaborators have also published on the design and assessment of evacuation drills and behavioural assumptions in modelling, topics that have been discussed in practitioner media and professional outlets, including the SFPE's Fire Protection Engineering magazine and interviews/podcasts.

== Recognition ==
In 2025, collaborative work on a bushfire evacuation simulator received coverage in trade and general media in connection with a U.S. award recognising the project's impact; reports noted Gwynne's contribution as part of a multi-institutional team. He has also been profiled for professional awards shortlists in management consulting industry media for thought leadership on human behaviour in emergencies.

Earlier, U.S. National Institute of Standards and Technology (NIST) reviews of evacuation models acknowledged Gwynne's role among model developers and experts consulted on model use and egress modelling.

== Selected works ==
Gwynne's publications include:

- Gwynne, S. et al. (2023). "Roxborough Park Community Wildfire Evacuation Drill: Data Collection and Model Benchmarking." Fire Technology 59(2): 879–901.
- Gwynne, S.; Galea, E.R.; Lawrence, P.J.; Filippidis, L. (2001). "Modelling occupant interaction with fire conditions using the buildingEXODUS evacuation model." Fire Safety Journal 36(4): 327–357.
- Wahlqvist, J.; Ronchi, E.; Lovreglio, R.; Nilsson, D.; Gwynne, S. (2021). "The simulation of wildland–urban interface fire evacuation: the WUI-NITY platform." Safety Science 136: 105130.
- Hunt, A.L.E.; Galea, E.R.; Lawrence, P.J.; Frost, I.R.; Gwynne, S.M.V. (2020). "Simulating movement devices used in hospital evacuation." Fire Technology 56(5): 2209–2240.
